Tony Pignone (born 18 March 1960) is an Australian former weightlifter. He competed in the men's middleweight event at the 1984 Summer Olympics.

References

External links
 

1960 births
Living people
Australian male weightlifters
Olympic weightlifters of Australia
Weightlifters at the 1984 Summer Olympics
Place of birth missing (living people)
Commonwealth Games medallists in weightlifting
Commonwealth Games silver medallists for Australia
Weightlifters at the 1982 Commonwealth Games
20th-century Australian people
21st-century Australian people
Medallists at the 1982 Commonwealth Games